A Woman of Impulse is a 1918 American silent drama film directed by Edward José and written by Eve Unsell based upon the play of the same name by Louis K. Anspacher. The film stars Lina Cavalieri, Gertrude Robinson, Raymond Bloomer, Robert Cain, Clarence Handyside, and Mathilde Brundage. The film was released on October 20, 1918, by Paramount Pictures.

Plot
As described in a film magazine, Leonora (Cavalieri), a poor lace maker, is given a musical education by Mr. and Mrs. Stuart (Handyside and Brundage), a wealthy American family, and soon becomes a prima donna. The Spanish Count Nerval (Bloomer) falls in love and marries her, but she refuses to give up her career. En route to America, her sister Nina (Robinson) meets a young American Dr. Paul Spencer (Austern), and, although in love with him, she becomes enamored with Phillip Gardiner (Cain), the son of a wealthy New Orleans family. They are all invited to visit to the Gardiner's in New Orleans, and there the Count becomes jealous of Leonora, thinking that an old affair with Phillip has been renewed. Phillip is found dead in the garden by the Count, having been stabbed with Leonora's jeweled dagger, and Leonora is suspected of the crime. The confession by the Creole servant Cleo (Uzzell) clears matters up, and Nina is happy in the doctor's arms while the Count swears to never doubt his wife again.

Cast
Lina Cavalieri as Leonora, 'La Vecci'
Gertrude Robinson as Nina
Raymond Bloomer as Count Nerval
Robert Cain as Phillip Gardiner
Clarence Handyside as Mr. Stuart
Mathilde Brundage as Mrs. Stuart
Leslie Austin as Dr. Paul Spencer
Corene Uzzell as Cleo 
Lucien Muratore 
Estar Banks

Reception
Like many American films of the time, A Woman of Impulse was subject to cuts by city and state film censorship boards. For example, the Chicago Board of Censors required a cut, in Reel 5, of the actual stabbing in the vision scene.

References

External links 

 

1918 films
1910s English-language films
Silent American drama films
1918 drama films
Paramount Pictures films
Films directed by Edward José
American black-and-white films
American silent feature films
1910s American films